The workforce or labour force is a concept referring to the pool of human beings either in employment or in unemployment. It is generally used to describe those working for a single company or industry, but can also apply to a geographic region like a city, state, or country. Within a company, its value can be labelled as its "Workforce in Place". The workforce of a country includes both the employed and the unemployed (labour force).

Formal and informal

Formal labour is any sort of employment that is structured and paid in a formal way. Unlike the informal sector of the economy, formal labour within a country contributes to that country's gross national product. Informal labour is labour that falls short of being a formal arrangement in law or in practice. It can be paid or unpaid and it is always unstructured and unregulated. Formal employment is more reliable than informal employment. Generally, the former yields higher income and greater benefits and securities for both men and women.

Informal labour
The contribution of informal labourers is immense. Informal labour is expanding globally, most significantly in developing countries. According to a study done by Jacques Charmes, in the year 2000 informal labour made up 57% of non-agricultural employment, 40% of urban employment, and 83% of the new jobs in Latin America. That same year, informal labour made up 78% of non-agricultural employment, 61% of urban employment, and 93% of the new jobs in Africa. Particularly after an economic crisis, labourers tend to shift from the formal sector to the informal sector. This trend was seen after the Asian economic crisis which began in 1997.

Informal labour and gender

Gender is frequently associated with informal labour. Women are employed more often informally than they are formally, and informal labour is an overall larger source of employment for females than it is for males. Women frequent the informal sector of the economy through occupations like home-based workers and street vendors.  The Penguin Atlas of Women in the World shows that in the 1990s, 81% of women in Benin were street vendors, 55% in Guatemala, 44% in Mexico, 33% in Kenya, and 14% in India. Overall, 60% of women workers in the developing world are employed in the informal sector.

The specific percentages are 84% and 58% for women in Sub-Saharan Africa and Latin America respectively. The percentages for men in both of these areas of the world are lower, amounting to 63% and 48% respectively. In Asia, 65% of women workers and 65% of men workers are employed in the informal sector. Globally, a large percentage of women that are formally employed also work in the informal sector behind the scenes. These women make up the hidden work force.

According to a 2021 FAO study, currently, 85 percent of economic activity in Africa is conducted in the informal sector where women account for nearly 90 percent of the informal labor force. According to the ILO’s 2016 employment analysis, 64 percent of informal employment is in agriculture (relative to industry and services) in sub-Saharan Africa. Women have higher rates of informal employment than men with 92 percent of women workers in informal employment versus 86 percent of men.

Formal and informal labour can be divided into the subcategories of agricultural work and non-agricultural work. Martha Chen et al. believe these four categories of labour are closely related to one another. A majority of agricultural work is informal, which the Penguin Atlas for Women in the World defines as unregistered or unstructured. Non-agricultural work can also be informal. According to Martha Chen et al., informal labour makes up 48% of non-agricultural work in North Africa, 51% in Latin America, 65% in Asia, and 72% in Sub-Saharan Africa.

Agriculture and informal economic activity are among some of the most important sources of livelihood for women. Women are estimated to account for approximately 70 percent of informal cross-border traders and are also prevalent among owners of micro, small, or medium-sized enterprises (MSMEs). MSMEs are more vulnerable to market shocks and market disruptions. For women-owned MSMEs this is often compounded by their lack of access to credit and financial liquidity compared to larger businesses. However, MSMEs are often more vulnerable to market shocks and market disruptions. For women-owned MSMEs, this is often compounded by their lack of access to credit and financial liquidity compared to larger businesses.

Agricultural work

Paid and unpaid
Paid and unpaid work are also closely related with formal and informal labour. Some informal work is unpaid, or paid under the table. Unpaid work can be work that is done at home to sustain a family, like child care work, or actual habitual daily labour that is not monetarily rewarded, like working the fields.  Unpaid workers have zero earnings, and although their work is valuable, it is hard to estimate its true value. The controversial debate still stands. Men and women tend to work in different areas of the economy, regardless of whether their work is paid or unpaid. Women focus on the service sector, while men focus on the industrial sector.

Unpaid work and gender
Women usually work fewer hours in income generating jobs than men do. Often it is housework that is unpaid. Worldwide, women and girls are responsible for a great amount of household work.

The Penguin Atlas of Women in the World, published in 2008, stated that in Madagascar, women spend 20 hours per week on housework, while men spend only two. In Mexico, women spend 33 hours and men spend 5 hours. In Mongolia the housework hours amount to 27 and 12 for women and men respectively. In Spain, women spend 26 hours on housework and men spend 4 hours. Only in the Netherlands do men spend 10% more time than women do on activities within the home or for the household.

The Penguin Atlas of Women in the World also stated that in developing countries, women and girls spend a significant amount of time fetching water for the week, while men do not. For example, in Malawi women spend 6.3 hours per week fetching water, while men spend 43 minutes. Girls in Malawi spend 3.3 hours per week fetching water, and boys spend 1.1 hours. Even if women and men both spend time on household work and other unpaid activities, this work is also gendered.

Sick leave and gender 
In the United Kingdom in 2014, two-thirds of workers on long-term sick leave were women, despite women only constituting half of the workforce, even after excluding maternity leave.

See also

Collective bargaining
Contingent workforce
Critique of work
Designation of workers by collar color
Division of labour
Employment-to-population ratio
Female labor force in the Muslim world
Feminisation of poverty
Human capital
Labour economics
List of countries by labor force
List of countries by sector composition of the labor force
Proletariat
Unemployment
Women in the workforce
Working class

References

Source

External links

 
 About the difference, in English, between the use/meaning of workforce/work force and labor/labour/labo(u)r pool